Johannes Baptista Fallati (15 March 1809 – 5 October 1855) was a German  statistician and economist.

Life and career
Fallati was born at Hamburg, where his father, originally of Rovigo (Venetia),  was a merchant.

Fallati was educated at the University of Tübingen and Heidelberg University, and in 1838 became professor  of political history and statistics at the University of Tübingen. In 1839 he travelled to England,  inquiring into English statistical societies and  other institutions. In 1848 he became a  member of the Württemberg parliament, and  under-secretary for commerce in the short-lived Frankfurt imperial assembly, 1848–49. On  its dissolution he returned to an academic  career, becoming in 1850 university librarian at Tübingen.

From 1844 till his death, Fallati was joint-editor of the quarterly Zeitschrift fur die gesammte Staatswissenschaft.  During his brief political career he planned  and embodied legislative organisation in four  directions, viz. the imperial consulate, inland navigation, marine measurement, and his most cherished idea an imperial statistical bureau.  He also prosecuted inquiry in the question of  emigration. To a winning personality and many-sided culture he united clear and practical method.
He died of cholera in The Hague.

Works, economic and statistical
 Die Statistischen Vereine der Englander, Tübingen, 1840.
Ueber die sogenannte materielle Tendenz der  Gegenwart, Tübingen, 1842.
Einleitung in die  Wissenschaft der Statistik Tübingen, 1843.
 In the Deutsche Vierteljahrsschrift " Ueber die  Haupterscheinungsformen der Sucht, schnell und muhelos reichtzuuwerden, im Gegensatze des Mittel-alters und der neueren Zeit", 1840. 3tes Heft.
In the Zeitschrift f. Staatsw. : on Social Origins,  i. (1844) ; 
on Association as a Moral Force, i.  (1844)
 on English Working Men's Clubs and  Institutes ; on Free Trade in Land ; and on  German Blue Books, ii. (1845) ;
 on Agriculture  and Technology at the Congresses of Italian  Scientists, iii. iv. (1846–47) ;
 on Progress in  Practical Statistics ; and on 'knodes of Statistical  Inquiry in England, France, and Belgium, iii. ;
 on  Dearth and Famine Policy in Belgium ; Belgian  Excise ; Belgian Census ; Statistics in Sicily, Denmark, and Schleswig-Holstein ; and Socialism and Communism, iv. ;
 on Statistics at the Lübeck  Germanist (Philoteuton) Conference, v. (1848) ; 
on  the Evolution of Law in Savage and Barbarous  Tribes ; 
a proposed Inland Navigation Law ; and  Administrative Statistics in Germany, vii, (1850) ;  
on Trade Combinations in France, viii. (1851) ;  
on Statistics of Area and Population in British  India ; and Administrative Statistics in Norway,  ix. (1852) ; 
on the Statistical Congress at Brussels,  ix. (1853).

References

German economists
German statisticians
1809 births
1855 deaths
Members of the Württembergian Chamber of Deputies
University of Tübingen alumni
Heidelberg University alumni
Academic staff of the University of Tübingen
People from Hamburg